General elections were held in Belize on 7 March 2012 to elect all 31 members of the Belize House of Representatives as well as offices in the various local governments. The election was run by the Elections and Boundaries Commission's Elections and Boundaries Department. Dean Barrow and his United Democratic Party (UDP) were re-elected, but lost eight seats to the opposition People's United Party (PUP) to maintain a slim 17-14 majority in the Belize House. The upper house of the Belize National Assembly, the Senate, was appointed after the election by the UDP-led government in accordance with the Constitution of Belize.

Contesting parties
Prime Minister Dean Barrow's United Democratic Party (UDP) was the incumbent in the election with his party holding 25 seats at dissolution. The opposition People's United Party (PUP), led by Francis Fonseca since late 2011, held the other seats in the Belize House. An unrepresented coalition of smaller parties ran in nine of the 31 constituencies under the banner of the Belize Unity Alliance.

Campaign
The UDP's primary campaign promise was to renegotiate the terms of a US$550 million bond repayment, which Barrow said would be his first task if re-elected. The bond accounted for 40% of Belize's economic output and half of the national debt, making Belize the 13th most indebted state in the world in 2012. The interest on the debt was scheduled to cost US$46 million in the year, which was 12% of the country's revenues at the time affected its ability to raise future funds after credit rating agencies downgraded the sovereign credit status to "junk." Conversely, Fonseca said that he would abide by the obligation to pay off the debt with promises to grow the country's current US$1.25 billion economy.

Another campaign theme was the issue of oil drilling off the coast of the country within proximity of the Belize Barrier Reef after Belize started exporting oil in 2006. However, opinion polls showed opposition to further oil exploration. Barrow promised to hold a referendum on the issue, while Fonseca pledged a moratorium over continued exploration.

The Belize Unity Alliance actively campaigned in such locales as San Pedro, the biggest town on Ambergris Caye, off the Belize coast, supporting independent candidates and calling for votes for the party. However, the coalition failed to make significant inroads and was not competitive in any of the 31 Belize House constituencies under the country's first past the post electoral system.

Unofficial referendum
On 29 February, Oceana, a member of the Belize Coalition to Save Our National Heritage, held an informal referendum that they called the "People's Referendum". The "referendum" consisted of 51 polling stations, including two mobile polling stations, manned by volunteers over the issue of oil drilling. A previous attempt to hold the referendum alongside the election was rejected after 40% of the petitioned signatures were disqualified due to double signatories and mismatched names with the official voter rolls. The voter turnout was 28,000. The group's vice president, Audrey Matura-Shepherd, said that the referendum sought to use "the law to force the government to hear the people."

Opinion polls
Opinion polls suggested a tight race with many undecided voters.

A poll conducted on 17 February 2012, the day of nominations for running in the election by former politician Derek Aikman, showed that the UDP held a majority of 16 seats and the PUP leading in nine seats, including Orange Walk Central, which they had won in the last poll; Fort George, Pickstock, Belize Rural South, Corozal Southeast, Corozal Bay, Cayo North, Cayo West, and Orange Walk North. The UDP led in Queen's Square, Port Loyola, Caribbean Shores, Mesopotamia, Collet, Lake Independence, Corozal North, Belmopan, Cayo Northeast, Cayo Central, and Orange Walk South. The other seats that could play the role of kingmaker included Albert, Freetown, Belize Rural North and Central, Dangriga and Stann Creek West, Toledo East and West, Corozal Southwest, Cayo South and Orange Walk East.

Another poll by Aikman on 2 March showed a large lead for the UDP, though many voters were willing to support PUP. The poll was of 8,847 voters, or 4.97%. The UDP's 15% lead in the nomination day poll fell to a 4% gap with a lead of 30% to 26% on 2 March. The BUA also recorded 1% support in the Belize Rural South and Belmopan. Undecided voters were at 43%.

Conduct
An Organization of American States (OAS) monitoring group observed the poll. The team was led by the former US Ambassador to Honduras Frank Almaguer; the team also comprised observers from Antigua and Barbuda, Argentina, Barbados, Canada, Chile, Colombia, Guyana, Martinique, Mexico, the United States and Venezuela. The Organization of American States Electoral Observation Mission (OAS/EOM) was present in all six districts. Afterwards the election was praised by the OAS as an "exemplary practice for the region."

Results
The total number of eligible voters was 178,054, out of a population of just over 300,000. There were 74 total candidates and 320 polling stations. For the simultaneous local elections, 97,979 of the voters had the choice to choose from 170 candidates at 168 of the polling stations.

The UDP did well in Belize City, holding all of their constituencies there as well as picking up Lake Independence and Albert. However the PUP made significant gains in the rural constituencies, especially in the south where they swept the constituencies in the Stann Creek and Toledo Districts.

By constituency

Source: Elections and Boundaries Department

Reactions
Domestic
Dean Barrow reacted to the victory by assuring the public that he would quickly appoint a delegation to renegotiate the terms of the so-called superbond with foreign financiers. Analysts at JP Morgan and Nomura Securities have estimated the government's chances of obtaining more favourable repayment terms after the positive completion of the electoral process. According to Nomura Securities analyst Boris Segura, the bond's interest could be reduced to 5% and the maturity extended to 2042. He also announced that he would approach Venezuelan leader Hugo Chávez to supply Belize with low-cost petroleum products. He cited this as in accordance with his self-declared pro-poor agenda and efforts to lower living costs.

PUP's Francis Fonseca had not conceded defeat the following day after the release of the official result. PUP claimed there were irregularities and filed a complaint against the result in three constituencies.

International
The OAS/EOM noted several issues during the campaign and voting process, such as the deployment of public resources, including government vehicles and drivers, for the use of the ruling party. They also claimed to have seen cases of vote buying. Though they praised the peaceful election procedure, the professionalism of the polling officials and the adequate representation of women in the process. Faced with the poll-watchers' report, Barrow recognised that though the election had not been perfect, but insisted that in an overall view it could be considered free and fair.

References

General elections in Belize
Belize
Belize
2012 in Belize